Machulishchy is a municipality and town in Belarus, in the Minsk Region, and is part of the Minsk District.  Its population, as of 2010, was of 7,300.

History
The town was first mentioned in 1590. In 1997 it received the status of "urban-type settlement" (Городской посёлок).

Geography
Situated in southern suburb of Minsk, Machulishi is part of its urban area and one of its main towns also with Zaslawye and Fanipal. It is served by a railway station on the Minsk-Babruysk-Gomel and by the M1 highway. A major Soviet air base (Machulishchy (air base)) operated adjacent to the west side of the town during the Cold War.

Gallery

References

External links

 Machulishchy official website

Urban-type settlements in Belarus
Populated places in Minsk Region
Minsk District
Populated places established in 1590
Minsk Voivodeship
Minsk Governorate